Neuf-Marché is a commune in the Seine-Maritime department in the Normandy region in north-western France.

Geography
This commune is the furthest southeast within the department and borders both the Eure and Oise departments.

Population

Places of interest
 The church of St. Pierre, dating from the tenth century.
 Traces of a feudal castle.
 Two eighteenth-century presbyteries.
 A sixteenth-century manorhouse.
 The nineteenth-century château of Vardes.
 A monument in the forest of Lyons by Robert Delandre.

People
 Béatrix Beck, author.
 Robert Delandre, sculptor.
 Bernard de Neufmarché, Norman lord active in the conquest of Wales 1088–1095.

See also
Communes of the Seine-Maritime department

References

Communes of Seine-Maritime